Paul Francis Webster (December 20, 1907 – March 18, 1984) was an American lyricist who won three Academy Awards for Best Original Song, and was nominated sixteen times for the award.

Life and career
Webster was born in New York City, United States, the son of Myron Lawrence Webster and Blanche Pauline Stonehill Webster. His family was Jewish. His father was born in Augustów, Poland. He attended the Horace Mann School (Riverdale, Bronx, New York), graduating in 1926, and then went to Cornell University from 1927 to 1928 and New York University from 1928 to 1930, leaving without receiving a degree. He worked on ships throughout Asia and then became a dance instructor at an Arthur Murray studio in New York City.

By 1931, however, he turned his career direction to writing song lyrics. His first professional lyric was "Masquerade" (music by John Jacob Loeb) which became a hit in 1932, performed by Paul Whiteman.

In 1935, Twentieth Century Fox signed him to a contract to write lyrics for Shirley Temple's films, but shortly afterward he went back to freelance writing. His first hit was a collaboration in 1941 with Duke Ellington on the song "I Got It Bad (And That Ain't Good)".

After 1950, Webster worked mostly for Metro-Goldwyn-Mayer. He won two Academy Awards in collaboration with Sammy Fain, in 1953 and 1955, and another with Johnny Mandel in 1965. Altogether, sixteen of his songs received Academy Award nominations; among lyricists, he is third after Sammy Cahn with twenty-six and Johnny Mercer, who was nominated eighteen times, in number of nominations. In addition, a large number of his songs became major hits on the popular music charts.

Webster is the most successful songwriter of the 1950s on the UK Singles Chart. In 1967, he was asked to write the lyrics for the Spider-Man theme song for the television cartoon series of the same name. He was inducted into the Songwriters Hall of Fame in 1972. His papers are collected at Syracuse University Libraries.

Webster's first born son, Guy Webster, was a prolific photographer of musicians and bands in the 1960s and 1970s. His younger son, Mona Roger Webster, is a conceptual artist, a real estate investor and a longtime resident of Venice, CA.

Webster continued writing through 1983. He died in 1984 in Beverly Hills, California, and is buried at Hillside Memorial Park in Culver City, California.

List of songs
Here is a partial list of songs for which he wrote the lyrics:

Songs by Paul Francis Webster that won the Academy Award for Best Original Song
"Secret Love" (Calamity Jane, 1953)
"Love Is a Many-Splendored Thing" (Love Is a Many-Splendored Thing, 1955)
"The Shadow of Your Smile" (The Sandpiper, 1965)

Nominated for the award
"Remember Me to Carolina" (Minstrel Man, 1944)
"Friendly Persuasion (Thee I Love)" (Friendly Persuasion, 1956)
"April Love" (April Love, 1957)
"A Certain Smile" (A Certain Smile, 1958)
"A Very Precious Love" (Marjorie Morningstar, 1958)
"The Green Leaves of Summer" (The Alamo, 1960)
"Love Theme from El Cid (The Falcon and the Dove)" (El Cid, 1961)
"Tender Is the Night" (Tender Is the Night, 1962)
"Love Song From Mutiny on the Bounty (Follow Me)" (Mutiny on the Bounty, 1962)
"So Little Time" (55 Days at Peking, 1963)
"A Time for Love" (An American Dream, 1966)
"Strange Are the Ways of Love" from the film The Stepmother (1972)
"A World that Never Was" from the film Half a House (1976)

Songs winning Grammy Awards for best song of the year
"The Shadow of Your Smile" (love theme from The Sandpiper, 1966)

Other songs with lyrics by Paul Francis Webster

Song compilation
 The Songs of Paul Francis Webster
 Award-Winning Songs By Paul Francis Webster, Robbins Music Corporation, 1964

References

External links

Other sources
 Hill, Tony L.  "Paul Francis Webster, 1907-1984", in Dictionary of Literary Biography 265.  Detroit: Gale Research, 2002.
 Sammy Lifetime Achievement Film Music Award for Paul Francis Webster

1907 births
1984 deaths
Best Original Song Academy Award-winning songwriters
American musical theatre lyricists
American lyricists
Broadway composers and lyricists
Songwriters from New York (state)
Cornell University alumni
Grammy Award winners
Horace Mann School alumni
Jewish American songwriters
United States Navy officers
20th-century American musicians
Burials at Hillside Memorial Park Cemetery
20th-century American Jews